Mercantile Discount Bank is a major commercial bank in Israel, and is a subsidiary of Israel Discount Bank. It is the sixth largest bank in Israel.

Controversies

Involvement in Israeli settlements 

On 12 February 2020, the United Nations published a database of companies doing business related in the West Bank, including East Jerusalem, as well as in the occupied Golan Heights. Mercantile Discount Bank was listed on the database on account of its activities in Israeli settlements in these occupied territories, which are considered illegal under international law.

Tax fraud affair in Australia
In 2021, MDB and its parent company IDB reached a settlement of ₪343 million (A$137 million) with the Australian Taxation Office, after allegedly conspiring with the Sydney-based Binetter family to engage in tax fraud.

References

Banks established in 1971
Banks of Israel
Financial services companies of Israel
Israeli brands
Economy of Israel
Israeli companies established in 1971